Shaandaar or Shandaar may refer to:
 Shaandaar (1974 film)
 Shandaar (1990 film)
 Shaandaar (2015 film)